Mi-Pay is a contactless NFC-based mobile payment system that supports credit, debit and public transportation cards in China. The service was launched by Xiaomi in partnership with UnionPay.

In December 2018 Xiaomi launched Mi Pay in India with partnership with ICICI Bank. Apart from sending and receiving money, one can pay utility bills and mobile and broadband recharges.

On 28 October, 2022, the company suddenly decided wound up their financial services in India, including mi pay and mi credit and decided to focus only on their core strength.

See also
Apple Pay
Samsung Pay

References 

Payment service providers
Online payments
Mobile payments in China